The 1963 Michigan State Spartans football team represented Michigan State University in the 1963 Big Ten Conference football season. In their 10th season under head coach Duffy Daugherty, the Spartans compiled a 6–2–1 overall record 4–1–1 against Big Ten opponents), finished in second place in the Big Ten Conference, and were ranked #9 in the final AP Poll.

Two Spartans were selected as first-team players on the 1963 All-Big Ten Conference football team. Halfback Sherman Lewis received first-team honors from the Associated Press (AP) and United Press International (UPI), and end Dan Underwood received first-team honors from the AP. Lewis was also a consensus first-team All-American.

Schedule

References

Michigan State
Michigan State Spartans football seasons
Michigan State Spartans football